Carol B. Stack (born 1940) is an Urban American anthropologist who specialized in studies of African American networks, minority women, and youth. Stack has taken a strong role in several social sciences, and is Professor Emerita of Education in the Graduate School of Education at University of California, Berkeley.

She taught at Boston University and Duke University before becoming Professor of Social and Cultural Studies in Education at Berkeley.

She is the author of All Our Kin: Strategies for Survival in a Black Community and Call To Home: African Americans Reclaim the Rural South.

Education 
Stack received her Masters in 1968 and her PhD in anthropology in 1972.

Accomplishments and awards 
Carol B. Stack was awarded the Prize for Critical Research in 1995 from the Society for the Anthropology of North America. She has also received many fellowships such as the Guggenheim, Rockefeller, and Russel Sage Fellowships.

Publications
All Our Kin: Strategies for Survival in a Black Community (1974,; latest reissue 2003,)
Call To Home: African-Americans Reclaim The Rural South (1996,;)

All Our Kin:Strategies for Survival in a Black Community 
Carol Stack's All Our Kin is a classic ethnography from the early 1970s. Her 1974 book All Our Kin has been described as "a classic of urban sociology", "one of the earliest and most popular accounts of how [black kinship] all works" and "influential". All Our Kin is the chronicle of a young white woman's sojourn into The Flats, an African-American ghetto community, to study the support system family and friends form when coping with poverty. The Book tore down stereotypes and opened the way for research on families and social structure in American communities. The book portrays of the social networks and value systems that evolved within African-American communities to combat grinding poverty. In communities plagued by single-parent families and joblessness, the book chronicles intense loyalties and an intricate trading system that ensures survival. All Our Kin challenges white America to reevaluate its notion of family.

Call To Home: African Americans Reclaim the Rural South 
Call To Home: African Americans Reclaim the Rural South is a poignant saga of a reverse exodus: the return of half a million black Americans to the rural South.There have been many books focusing on the black migration out of the South into Northern cities. But few people are aware that over the past 20 years the trend has been in the other direction, with African-Americans moving back south, to some of the least promising places in all of America—places the Department of Agriculture calls “Persistent Poverty Counties.” Carol Stack brings their stories to life in this captivating book. Interweaving a powerful human story with a larger economic and social analysis of migration, poverty, and the urban underclass, Call to Home offers a rare glimpse of African-American families pulling together and trying to make it in today's America.

References 

1940 births
Living people
American women anthropologists
Boston University faculty
Duke University faculty
University of California, Berkeley Graduate School of Education faculty
American women sociologists
American sociologists
21st-century American women